Victório dos Reis Ferraz (27 January 1924 – 2006) was a Brazilian sailor who competed in the 1948 Summer Olympics. Ferraz died in 2006.

References

1924 births
2006 deaths
Brazilian male sailors (sport)
Olympic sailors of Brazil
Sailors at the 1948 Summer Olympics – Swallow